Rasayani railway station is a railway station on the Panvel–Roha route of Central Railway. It is at a distance of 79.8 km from Chhatrapati Shivaji Terminus via . Its station code is RSYI. It belongs to the Mumbai division of Central Railway.

The station is situated in Raigad district of Navi Mumbai city, of Maharashtra, an Indian state.

References

Railway stations in Raigad district
Mumbai Suburban Railway stations
Panvel-Roha rail line